is a Japanese voice actress from Tokyo, Japan.

Filmography

Anime
Classmates 2 Special: Graduation as Yousuke's Girlfriend
Happiness! as Otoha Kohinata
Fortune Arterial as Shizuko Amaike
Kakyuusei as Mayumi Tachibana
Saiyuki as Shaohei
To Heart as Akari's mother (ep 13)

Video games
Puyo Puyo~n as Rulue
Muv-Luv as Mana Tsukuyomi

Drama CDs
Analyst no Yuutsu series 1: Benchmark ni Koi wo Shite (Reiko Nishiyama)

External links
 Official agency profile 
 

Living people
Japanese video game actresses
Japanese voice actresses
Voice actresses from Tokyo
Year of birth missing (living people)